Sanak Island is an island in the Fox Islands group of the Aleutian Islands in the U.S. state of Alaska.

Sanak Island and Caton Island are the largest islands in the Sanak Islands subgroup of the Fox Islands.

Travel to the island is currently done by fishing vessel.  The trip takes about five hours to cross the roughly 40 mile distance from King Cove to Sanak.

History
Like many of the other Aleutian Islands, Sanak was inhabited by the Aleut people for thousands of years. In 1828, the administrators of Russian America removed the island's population to the Alaska Peninsula in order to preserve the sea otter hunting grounds in surrounding waters.

Two famous shipwrecks, one in 1906 and another in 1943, occurred near Sanak.  The U.S. Navy operated a small naval base at Sanak Island during World War II.

Although Sanak is no longer occupied, the island is still owned by its former residents, who visit the island occasionally to harvest the feral cattle that live there.

Archaeology
In 2004, 2006, and 2007 teams of archeologists and ecologists visited Sanak Island to study the effects of long-term human occupation on the island.  Over 100 archeological sites were excavated with the oldest sites dating to 5600 years before present.

Researchers, led by investigators from Idaho State University studied both the living plants and animals as well as the remains of food animals such as fish, sea mammals, and shellfish preserved in archeological sites.

References 

Fox Islands (Alaska)
Islands of Aleutians East Borough, Alaska
Archaeological sites in Alaska
Uninhabited islands of Alaska
Feral cattle
Islands of Alaska